Mantua is a neighborhood in the West Philadelphia section of Philadelphia, Pennsylvania. It is located north of Spring Garden Street, east of 40th Street, south of Mantua Avenue, and west of 31st Street. The neighborhood's northern and western reaches are predominantly working-class and African American, although its southern border with Powelton Village has seen recent gentrification and an influx of Drexel University and University of Pennsylvania student renters.

History

1600s
Part of this neighborhood was purchased from the Lenni Lenape Indians in 1677 by William Warner. In 1692, a young Welsh carpenter, William Powel, opened a ferry over the Schuylkill River at the foot of the present Spring Garden Bridge. Lancaster Pike and Haverford Road were the first routes providing access from the west.

1800s
Mantua was named in 1809 by Judge Richard Peters, who designed a grid of lots with 36th St. and Haverford Ave. as the center. He named the area for a city in Italy.

Powelton Village, the neighborhood just south of Mantua, was named for the family of William Powell, whose son purchased additional land. By the mid-1880s, Powelton Village was a fashionable area, becoming part of Philadelphia after the Consolidation Act of 1854.

1940s–1950s
Prior to the 1940s, Mantua was a predominantly white, Lutheran neighborhood. However, these decades mark the time when black families began moving into the area’s boundaries. The 1950s are what is seen as the peak of the neighborhood, which boasted a stunning commercial district on Haverford Avenue.

1960s
Beginning in the early- to mid-1960s, the 19,000 neighborhood residents started seeing the beginnings of gang warfare. Despite the prevalence of crime and violence on the streets, community activists like Herman Wrice and Andrew Jenkins came together to form the Young Great Society and the Mantua Community Planners.

These committees held community functions almost daily. Functions included arts and crafts, vocal groups, day trips, and tutoring sessions.  As  Police Commissioner, Frank Rizzo gave Mantua community leaders access to local police stations. If a local kid was arrested due to gang-related activities, community leaders would post bail and safely escort these residents home. In return, these activists would work with police to help deter kids from future participation in street life. Although these committees were ultimately trying to keep young residents off the streets, Mantua was one of the most crime-laden neighborhoods in Philadelphia.

Over the course of the decade, six major gangs called the 10.5 block area of Mantua their home. Between 1960 and 1969, Mantua recorded about 10% of total city gang killings. Mantua became one of the worst areas of the 16th precinct, and the Philadelphia Police Department often assigned patrols in Mantua to officers as punishment.

1970s
Andrew Jenkins and the Mantua Community Planners began working with the city to build a recreation center in Mantua. However, gang violence continuously delayed these efforts. The neighborhood’s first recreation center finally opened on what is now 34th Street and Haverford Avenue. In addition to the playgrounds, ball courts, and offices featured at most recreation centers, this one also housed a free library, and holding a library card was a requirement for entrance to the play centers.

Despite the crime, Wrice's Young Great Society and Jenkins' Mantua Community Planners fought to incorporate urban renewal programs, such as the planting of trees and building of housing units. Mt. Vernon Manor, a collection of apartment buildings, was once such development project.

Designed as part of the multipurpose Mantua Community Center, the Mantua library branch opened July 9, 1979. The building also includes a Department of Recreation gymnasium, a community office, and a meeting room.

1980s
Like many industrialized cities in the 1980s, Philadelphia saw a rise of drug-related gang warfare. The use of crack cocaine, combined with the existing heroin market, caused many residents to flee.

Andrew Jenkins began an eight-year stint as Deputy Mayor, and in 1988 Herman Wrice formed Mantua Against Drugs (MAD). Wrice led community marches against drugs and put up wanted posters of the drug dealers that operated freely on the corners.

Despite Wrice’s efforts, infighting between community leaders prevented a lot of potential progress. According to Jenkins, “The lowest point of the neighborhood was in the late 80s. The biggest failure of the Mantua Community was the jealousy of the leaders who were not successful; they attacked the leaders that were. They put rumors and stigmas on active leaders – that’s what destroyed the neighborhood.”

1990s
Although the drug trade began winding down in the 1990s, the community was feeling its lasting effects. The number of residents in the community fluttered around 6,000 most of the decade, and several hundred vacant lots dotted the streets. The movie theaters, retail outlets, and galleries that resided in Mantua during the 1950s were replaced by small delis and grab-and-go beer stores.

In the late-1990s, many of the abandoned lots and buildings were bought, renovated, and put on the market for rent. The neighborhood saw an influx of college students from Drexel University, among other institutions, move into the area in search of affordable housing.

The Mantua library branch was renamed the Charles L. Durham Free Library in 1995. Born in Mantua, Durham served on City Council from 1967 to 1974, when he was appointed to the Common Pleas Court. He was a strong advocate for the community, and was deeply involved in the struggle for civil rights and was part of the first black caucus on Council. The library was renovated in 1999 as part of the Free Library of Philadelphia "Changing Lives" campaign, which refurbished branches and ensured Internet access.

2000s
It is estimated that between 500 and 1000 college-aged students are living in Mantua. This growing number of students has brought renewed interest to the Mantua community from the expanding university system to the south, consisting mainly of Drexel University and the University of Pennsylvania.

See also
 Spiral Q Puppet Theater
 Gentrification in Philadelphia#University City and Mantua

References

External links

 InfoResources West Philadelphia Neighborhood - Mantua
 "We Are Mantua" website
 University City Historical Society - Mantua
 "Emlenton" to Mantua
 Historic Photographs of Mantua, PhillyHistory.org
 Charles L. Durham Library
 Mantua Civic Association

Neighborhoods in Philadelphia
West Philadelphia